In complex analysis, Liouville's theorem, named after Joseph Liouville (although the theorem was first proven by Cauchy in 1844), states that every bounded entire function must be constant. Equivalently, non-constant holomorphic functions on  have unbounded images.

The theorem is considerably improved by Picard's little theorem, which says that every entire function whose image omits two or more complex numbers must be constant.

Proof 

This important theorem has several proofs.

A standard analytical proof uses the fact that holomorphic functions are analytic. 

Another proof uses the mean value property of harmonic functions.

The proof can be adapted to the case where the harmonic function f is merely bounded above or below. See Harmonic function#Liouville's theorem.

Corollaries

Fundamental theorem of algebra
There is a short proof of the fundamental theorem of algebra based upon Liouville's theorem.

No entire function dominates another entire function
A consequence of the theorem is that "genuinely different" entire functions cannot dominate each other, i.e. if f and g are entire, and |f| ≤ |g| everywhere, then f = α·g for some complex number α. Consider that for g = 0 the theorem is trivial so we assume  Consider the function h = f/g. It is enough to prove that h can be extended to an entire function, in which case the result follows by Liouville's theorem. The holomorphy of h is clear except at points in g−1(0). But since h is bounded and all the zeroes of g are isolated, any singularities must be removable. Thus h can be extended to an entire bounded function which by Liouville's theorem implies it is constant.

If f is less than or equal to a scalar times its input, then it is linear
Suppose that f is entire and |f(z)| is less than or equal to M|z|, for M a positive real number. We can apply Cauchy's integral formula; we have that

where I is the value of the remaining integral. This shows that f′ is bounded and entire, so it must be constant, by Liouville's theorem. Integrating then shows that f is affine and then, by referring back to the original inequality, we have that the constant term is zero.

Non-constant elliptic functions cannot be defined on ℂ
The theorem can also be used to deduce that the domain of a non-constant elliptic function f cannot be  Suppose it was. Then, if a and b are two periods of f such that  is not real, consider the parallelogram P whose vertices are 0, a, b and a + b. Then the image of f is equal to f(P). Since f is continuous and P is compact, f(P) is also compact and, therefore, it is bounded. So, f is constant.

The fact that the domain of a non-constant elliptic function f can not be  is what Liouville actually proved, in 1847, using the theory of elliptic functions. In fact, it was Cauchy who proved Liouville's theorem.

Entire functions have dense images
If f is a non-constant entire function, then its image is dense in  This might seem to be a much stronger result than Liouville's theorem, but it is actually an easy corollary. If the image of f is not dense, then there is a complex number w and a real number r  > 0 such that the open disk centered at w with radius r has no element of the image of f. Define 

Then g is a bounded entire function, since for all ,

So, g is constant, and therefore f is constant.

On compact Riemann surfaces 
Any holomorphic function on a compact Riemann surface is necessarily constant.

Let  be holomorphic on a compact Riemann surface . By compactness, there is a point  where  attains its maximum.

Remarks 

In light of the power series expansion, it is not surprising that Liouville's theorem holds.

This extended version of Liouville's theorem can be more precisely stated: if  for  sufficiently large, then  is a polynomial of degree at most . This can be proved as follows.

The argument used during the proof using Cauchy estimates shows that for all ,

So, if , then

Therefore, .

Liouville's theorem does not extend to the generalizations of complex numbers known as double numbers and dual numbers.

See also
 Mittag-Leffler's theorem

References

External links

 

Theorems in complex analysis
Articles containing proofs
holomorphic functions